Villa Mercedes is a city in the province of San Luis, Argentina. It lies on the center-east of the province, on the left-hand banks of the Quinto River, 32 km from the border with Córdoba, on National Route 148, and near the intersection of National Routes 8 and 7. National Route 7 links the city to the provincial capital San Luis, 90 km to the north-west.

The city was founded by Governor Justo Daract on or around December 1, 1856, as Fortín Constitucional, a mixed civilian-military fort, to protect the territory against attacks by the Ranquel aboriginal tribes. The original name was changed in 1861 to Villa Mercedes by decision of the residents, who had adopted the Virgin of Mercy (Virgen de las Mercedes) as their patron.

Villa Mercedes grew quickly after a railway line from Villa María on the Central Argentine line between Rosario and Córdoba, reached the town in  1875.   Built by the State-owned company Ferrocarril Andino, the line was extended to San Juan in 1885 via San Luis and Mendoza.  The line from Villa Mercedes to Mendoza would become the middle section of the route from Buenos Aires and was bought by the Argentine Great Western Railway in 1887 and later became part of the Buenos Aires and Pacific Railway network.

Villa Mercedes was officially declared a city in 1896. It is now the second largest in San Luis, and an industrial and educational center, hosting a branch of the National University of San Luis.

It is served by Villa Reynolds Airport.

Climate
Villa Mercedes has a dry winter humid subtropical climate (Köppen Cwa), typical from the geographic center of Argentina. Summer is warm to hot with frequent thunderstorms, whereas winter is dry and prone to heavy frosts. Snowfall is unusual but still more common than in Eastern Argentina, and occasionally it can stay on ground during a couple of days, as it happened during the July 2007 Argentine winter storm, when temperature hit -16.8 °C, the lowest on record for the city.

References

H.R.Stones, British Railways in Argentina 1860-1948, P.E.Waters & Associates, Bromley, Kent, England, 1993.
 
  Municipality of Villa Mercedes (official website).

Populated places in San Luis Province
Populated places established in 1856
Cities in Argentina
Argentina